The Latvian nationality law is based on the Citizenship Law of 1994 (as at 2013, amended four times, most recently through the amendments approved by the Parliament of Latvia on May 9, 2013). It is primarily based on jus sanguinis.

History
The first nationality law of Latvia was adopted in August, 1919. In September, 1940, the Supreme Soviet of the Soviet Union adopted a decree on the order of receiving USSR citizenship by the citizens of the Latvian, Lithuanian and Estonian SSRs, after the Baltic states had been occupied by the Soviet Union. In October, 1991, the Supreme Council of the Republic of Latvia has adopted a resolution "On the renewal of Republic of Latvia citizens' rights and fundamental principles of naturalization" declaring the 1940 decree null and void with regard to Republic of Latvia citizens. 

On 2 September 2012, the Central Election Commission received a draft for amendments to the Citizenship Law, providing that, from 1 January 2014, all non-citizens (a status held by former USSR citizens who do not possess citizenship of Latvia or any other state and who do not apply for citizenship while residing in Latvia), who by 30 November 2013 had not applied, under the rules of the Cabinet of Ministers, to retain the status of non-citizen shall be considered to be citizens of Latvia; these amendments would have automatically granted citizenship to any person who might have the status of non-citizen, without regard for place of residence, interest in acquiring citizenship of Latvia, and awareness of the amendments. The Central Election Commission sought opinions from legal experts before itself making any decision on the admissibility and sufficiency of the popular initiative. The majority of the experts requested were inclined to consider there to have been sound arguments for ceasing organisation of the popular initiative, the Central Election Commission went along with their opinion.

Dual citizenship
Dual citizenship is not prohibited by Latvian citizenship law. According to the amendments to the Citizenship Law which came into force on 1 October 2013, citizenship of Latvia may be retained for persons who have acquired the citizenship of:
 another EU Member State or an EFTA Member State;
 another NATO Member State;
 Australia, Brazil or New Zealand;
 such a country with which Latvia has concluded an agreement on the recognition of dual citizenship (no such agreement is currently concluded);
 a country not referred to previously if due to important national interests permission from the Government of Latvia is received to retain dual citizenship;
 a country not referred to previously if it has been acquired automatically (ex lege), through marriage or as a result of adoption.
Children of citizens of Latvia may hold dual citizenship with any country.  Some countries, such as Japan, however, do not permit their nationals to also, after reaching adulthood, hold a foreign citizenship.  A dual Latvian-Japanese national must declare, to Japan's Ministry of Justice, his or her intention as to which citizenship to keep, before turning 22.

Before October 1, 2013, the newly acquired non-Latvian citizenship is simply not recognised by the Republic of Latvia, with the exception of a transitional clause: Latvia allows dual citizenship for those and their descendants who were forced to leave Latvia during the Soviet or Nazi occupations and adopted another citizenship while away from Latvia. In order to be eligible for dual citizenship, they had to claim it by July 1, 1995. If such a claim is made after this date, they shall renounce the citizenship of another state. If by a law of another state a Latvian citizen may be a citizen of this state, in relations with Latvia this person is considered solely as a Latvian citizen.

In general terms, you might be eligible to get Latvian citizenship by descent and keep existing citizenship (dual citizenship) if:
 One of your parents, grandparents or grand-grandparents was a Latvian citizen prior to 1940.
 They withdrew or were exiled from Latvia during the 1940-1990 period.

The application procedure requires having documents that prove your connection to the family member with Latvian heritage and proof that they withdrew or were exiled. If the ancestors of the applicant left prior to 1940, he/she will still be able to qualify for citizenship, but will not qualify to have dual citizenship.

Travel Freedom & Quality of Nationality
In 2017, the Latvian nationality is ranked twenty-third in the Nationality Index (QNI). The QNI considers travel freedom and internal factors such as peace & stability, economic strength, and human development as well.

Citizenship of the European Union
Because Latvia forms part of the European Union, Latvian citizens are also citizens of the European Union under European Union law and thus enjoy rights of free movement and have the right to vote in elections for the European Parliament. When in a non-EU country where there is no Latvian embassy, Latvian citizens have the right to get consular protection from the embassy of any other EU country present in that country. Latvian citizens can live and work in any country within the EU as a result of the right of free movement and residence granted in Article 21 of the EU Treaty.

See also
Non-citizens (Latvia)
Visa requirements for Latvian citizens

References

External links
 Citizenship Law, as amended in 2013 (up-to-date, as at 2019)
 Data on Latvia at the European Union Observatory on Democracy (Robert Schuman Centre, European University Institute)
 Decisions of the Constitutional Court of the Republic of Latvia:
 Judgment in Case No. 2009-94-01 (on the Paragraph 1 of the Transitional Provisions of the Citizenship Law)  and press release on the judgment, in English
 Decision to terminate the case 2007-07-01 
 Information on citizenship of Latvia at the nationality portal of the Council of Europe
 Citizenship section on the website of the Office of Citizenship and Migration Affairs

 
Latvia and the European Union